Phyllopeltula is a genus of fungi within the family Peltulaceae. It contains two species: Phyllopeltula corticola and Phyllopeltula steppae.

References

External links
Index Fungorum

Lichinomycetes
Lichen genera
Taxa named by Klaus Kalb